is a one-shot Japanese manga written and illustrated by Kazuhiko Mishima.  It is serialized in Biblos's manga magazine, Be x Boy , collected in four chapters. It is licensed in North America by Digital Manga Publishing, which released the manga through its imprint, Juné, on September 9, 2008.

Reception
ActiveAnime's Holly Ellingwood commends the manga as "one of the most hilarious yaoi romantic comedies in manga". Coolstreak Comics' Leroy Douresseaux comments that the bonus story is “Sensei” "is sweet, charming, and almost too sentimental to be included with the lustier You Make My Head Spin." Mania.com's Danielle van Gorder comments that Shindou's "deadpan declarations, complete with sparkles, were just so absurd that I couldn't help but laugh." She also commends the manga's art, saying, "the art here is heavy on the sharp, crisp lines, very precise and clean.  Other than some screentone, shading is limited to hatching with those same crisp lines.  It's a look that works very well, even with the relatively basic page layouts.  The character designs are nicely distinct, especially the side characters.  The character eyes especially are very well done".

References

2007 manga
Digital Manga Publishing titles
Comedy-drama anime and manga
Josei manga
Yaoi anime and manga